Zeta Cancri (ζ Cancri, abbreviated Zeta Cnc, ζ Cnc) is a multiple star system in the constellation of Cancer. It is approximately 83.4 light-years from Earth, and has a combined apparent magnitude of +4.67. Since it is near the ecliptic, it can be occulted by the Moon and, very rarely, by planets.

The system is constituted as follows:
 A binary pair designated Zeta1 Cancri or, alternatively, Zeta Cancri AB, the two components of which are themselves designated Zeta1 Cancri A or, simply, Zeta Cancri A (formally also named Tegmine , the traditional name of the Zeta Cancri system) and Zeta1/Zeta Cancri B.
 A triple star system designated Zeta2 Cancri or alternatively Zeta Cancri C, consisting of a single star primary, designated Zeta2/Zeta Cancri Ca, together with a secondary binary pair, designated Zeta2/Zeta Cancri Cb. The binary pair's two components are themselves designated Zeta2/Zeta Cancri Cb1 and Cb2.

Nomenclature
ζ Cancri (Latinised to Zeta Cancri) is the system's Bayer designation; ζ1 Cancri and ζ2 Cancri those of its two constituents. The designations of the two constituents as ζ Cancri AB and C, and those of their components—ζ Cancri A, B, Ca, Cb, Cb1 and Cb2—derive from the convention used by the Washington Multiplicity Catalog (WMC) for multiple star systems, and adopted by the International Astronomical Union (IAU).

Considerable confusion had developed concerning the catalogue identities of the three bright stars; correct correspondences were worked out by Griffin:

Zeta Cancri bore the traditional name Tegmine (Tegmen) "the shell (of the crab)". In 2016, the International Astronomical Union organized a Working Group on Star Names (WGSN) to catalogue and standardize proper names for stars. The WGSN decided to attribute proper names to individual stars rather than entire multiple systems. It approved the name Tegmine for the component Zeta1 Cancri A on 12 September 2016 and it is now so included in the List of IAU-approved Star Names.

Properties
Zeta Cancri can be resolved as a binary star in small telescopes. Its binary nature was discovered in 1756 by Tobias Mayer. William Herschel resolved the two components that make up Zeta1 Cancri in 1781. As early as 1831, John Herschel noticed perturbations in Zeta2 Cancri's orbit around Zeta1; this led Otto Wilhelm von Struve, in 1871, to postulate a fourth, unseen, component which orbited closely the visible member of Zeta2. Later observations have resolved this fourth component and have indicated that there may be one or two more unobserved components.

Zeta1 and Zeta2 Cancri are 5.06 arcseconds apart. These two star systems orbit around their common centre of mass once every 1,100 years.

Zeta1 Cancri
The two components are both yellow-white main-sequence dwarfs of spectral class F. The apparent magnitudes of A and B are +5.58 and +5.99, respectively. They are separated, as of 2008, by 1 arcsecond, requiring a large telescope to resolve them, but this separation will increase until the year 2020. They complete one orbit every 59.6 years. The estimated masses for the pair are 1.28 and 1.18 solar masses, respectively.

Zeta2 Cancri
Zeta Cancri Ca is the brightest of the three components, having an apparent magnitude of +6.12. It appears to be a yellow G-type star, often reported as G5V, but now thought to be earlier, probably G0V. This star has around 1.15 solar masses. The tenth magnitude Zeta Cancri Cb is a close pair of red dwarfs. The separation between Ca and Cb is approximately 0.3 arcsecond, and their orbital period is 17 years.

References

Cancer (constellation)
Cancri, Zeta
Cancri, 16
5
F-type main-sequence stars
G-type main-sequence stars
M-type main-sequence stars
Tegmine
Durchmusterung objects
040167
3208 09 10
068255 6 7